The Higashiyama Treasure (東山御物 Higashiyama gyomutsu, Higashiyama gomotsu) was a collection of important and valuable artefacts by the Ashikaga shogunate. It is named after the residence of the 8th shōgun of the Ashikaga shogunate,  (1436–1490), in the eastern hills (東山 Higashiyama) of the capital city Kyoto. The items consisted mostly of karamono (Chinese items) and consisted of ceramics, lacquerware, paintings, calligraphy, and others. It represented the pinnacle of Higashiyama culture.

After the fall of the shogunate, the treasures were dispersed and some survived and are listed as either National Treasures or objects of Important Cultural Property.

The collecting of important items was continued by the warlords Oda Nobunaga and Toyotomi Hideyoshi, who laid great emphasis on Japanese tea utensils as chadō was developed. These were known as special tea utensils (名物 meibutsu, 大名物 ).

List of existing items 
 Summer Mountain (夏景山水図), National Treasure, Kuon-ji, Minobu, Yamanashi 
 Autumn Landscape (秋景山水図), National Treasure, Konchi-in, Kyoto
 Winter Landscape (冬景山水図), National Treasure, Konchi-in, Kyoto
 Sakyamuni descending the mountain after asceticism / Snowy Landscape (出山釈迦図・雪景山水図), National Treasure, Tokyo National Museum
 Han-shan and Shi-de (寒山拾得図), Important Cultural Property, Tokyo National Museum
 (紙本墨画布袋図), Important Cultural Property, private collection 
 (紙本墨画老子像), Important Cultural Property, Okayama Prefectural Museum of Art 
 Insects and Flower Plants (草虫図), Important Cultural Property, Tokyo National Museum
 Bamboos and Insects (竹虫図), Important Cultural Property, Tokyo National Museum
 Plum Flower and Two Sparrows (梅花双雀図), Important Cultural Property, Tokyo National Museum

See also 

 List of National Treasures of Japan

References 

Muromachi period